Sidney John Redgrave (5 August 1878 – 3 August 1958) was an Australian cricketer. He played 26 first-class matches for New South Wales and Queensland between 1904/05 and 1921/22.

Early life
Born John Sydney, he was always known as Sidney John. He was born in Sydney to Mary Kielly and Thomas Redgrave. He attended Newington College.

After a few games for New South Wales, Sid Redgrave took up a coaching position in Brisbane in 1907. He represented Queensland regularly between 1907 and 1921, with a highest score of 107 in a team total of 181 against New South Wales in 1911/12. He continued to coach in Brisbane after his first-class career ended, and was also a state selector. His younger brother Bill left Sydney in 1903 to play first-class cricket in New Zealand.

See also
 List of New South Wales representative cricketers

References

External links
 

1878 births
1958 deaths
Australian cricketers
New South Wales cricketers
Queensland cricketers
Cricketers from Sydney
Australian cricket coaches
People educated at Newington College